Charles Wiggers was a Belgian racewalker. He competed in the men's 10 kilometres walk at the 1920 Summer Olympics.

References

Year of birth missing
Year of death missing
Athletes (track and field) at the 1920 Summer Olympics
Belgian male racewalkers
Olympic athletes of Belgium
Place of birth missing